The Road to You is the second live album by the Pat Metheny Group that won the Grammy Award for Best Contemporary Jazz Performance.

The songs were recorded during concerts in Naples, Bari, Pescara, and Iesi, Italy; and Paris, Marseille, and Besançon, France. The last song is a solo guitar studio recording from the video More Travels.

Track listing

Personnel
 Pat Metheny – acoustic and electric guitar, guitar synthesizer
 Lyle Mays – piano, keyboards
 Steve Rodby – acoustic and electric bass
 Paul Wertico – drums
 Armando Marçal – percussion, timbales, congas, voice
 Pedro Aznar – voice, acoustic guitar, percussion, saxophone, steel drums, vibraphone, marimba, melodica

Awards
Grammy Awards

Video

Personnel
Pat Metheny – guitars, guitar synthesizer, electric sitar
Lyle Mays – piano, synthesizers
Steve Rodby – double bass, electric bass
Paul Wertico – drums
Armando Marçal – percussion
Pedro Aznar – vocals, guitar, percussion, vibraphone, marimba, glockenspiel, tenor saxophone

Credits
Video directed by Jan Egleson
Video produced by Marcus Viscidi
Executive producer – Ted Kurland, Daihei Shiohama and David Sholemson
Associate producer – Pat Metheny and Steve Rodby
Music produced by Pat Metheny 
Music co-produced by Steve Rodby
Design – Howard Cummings 
Director of Photography – Paul Goldsmith
Edited by William A. Anderson
Associate producer – David Oakes
Recorded and mixed by Rob Eaton

References

1983 live albums
Pat Metheny live albums
Grammy Award for Best Contemporary Jazz Album